Neo-bop as a subgenre emerged within jazz during the early 1980s.

This list is derived from All Music and may contain inaccuracies. In addition the source indicates most or all these musicians work in others genres as well with Post-bop and Hard bop being most common.

B

 Kenny Barron
 Gary Bartz
 Brian Blade
 Terence Blanchard

C

 James Carter
 Cyrus Chestnut

D

 Ray Drummond

F

 John Faddis
 Sonny Fortune

G

 Benny Green
 Jimmy Greene

H

 Roy Hargrove
 Antonio Hart
 John Hicks

L

 Joe Lovano

M

 Russell Malone
 Branford Marsalis
 Wynton Marsalis
 Tarus Mateen
 Christian McBride
 Mulgrew Miller

P

 Nicholas Payton

R

 Joshua Redman
 Eric Reed

W

 Tim Warfield
 Kenny Washington
 Bobby Watson
 Ernie Watts
 Steve Wilson
 Rodney Whitaker

Notes 

Jazz musicians by genre
Lists of jazz musicians